The 2012 UEFA Women's Champions League Final was the final match of the 2011–12 UEFA Women's Champions League, the 11th season of the UEFA Women's Champions League football tournament and the third since it was renamed from the UEFA Women's Cup. The match was held in the Olympiastadion in Munich, Germany on 17 May 2012. Lyon won the tournament, beating Frankfurt 2–0 to retain the trophy.

Lyon played the final for the third consecutive time. It also marked the third time in a row that a French and a German club met in the final.

The attendance of 50,212 was claimed by UEFA as a European record for women's club football, ignoring the existence of earlier  reported women's club match attendances of 53,000. Both figures were later surpassed by a 2019 match in Spain.

Route to the final

Match

Details

See also
2011–12 UEFA Women's Champions League

References

Final, Uefa
Uefa Women's Champions League Final 2012
2012
Sports competitions in Munich
2010s in Munich
UEFA
UEFA
UEFA Women's Champions League Final 2011